Cyperus ephemerus is a species of sedge that is native to parts of Iran.

See also 
 List of Cyperus species

References 

ephemerus
Plants described in 2005
Flora of Iran